The men's épée was one of ten fencing events on the fencing at the 1996 Summer Olympics programme. It was the twenty-second appearance of the event. The competition was held on 20 July 1996. 45 fencers from 21 nations competed, a sharply reduced number from prior Games which generally had 60 to 80 fencers. Each nation remained limited to 3 fencers in the event. The event was won by Aleksandr Beketov of Russia, the nation's first victory and first medal in the event in its debut (though it was the third straight Games with a Russian on the podium, with Andrey Shuvalov taking bronze for the Soviet Union in 1988 and Pavel Kolobkov earning silver representing the Unified Team in 1992). Iván Trevejo's silver was Cuba's first medal in the event since Ramón Fonst won the first two gold medals in 1900 and 1904. The bronze went to Géza Imre of Hungary, that nation's first medal in the men's individual épée since 1980. France's four-Games podium streak ended.

Background

This was the 22nd appearance of the event, which was not held at the first Games in 1896 (with only foil and sabre events held) but has been held at every Summer Olympics since 1900.

All eight quarterfinalists from 1992 returned: gold medalist Éric Srecki of France, silver medalist Pavel Kolobkov of the Unified Team (now representing Russia), bronze medalist Jean-Michel Henry of France, fourth-place finisher Kaido Kaaberma of Estonia, and quarterfinalists Elmar Borrmann of Germany, Iván Kovács of Hungary, Angelo Mazzoni of Italy, and Mauricio Rivas of Colombia. Kolobkov had won the World Championship in 1993 and 1994; Srecki was the reigning World Champion having won in 1995.

Belarus, the Czech Republic, and Russia each made their debut in the event. France, Sweden, and the United States each appeared for the 20th time, tied for most among nations.

Competition format

The 1996 tournament eliminated pool play, a staple of Olympic fencing since 1896. The double-elimination rounds that had been used for the past few Games were also eliminated. For the first time, the format consisted entirely of a single-elimination bracket with a bronze medal match. The 15-touch bout was introduced for the first time, with all bouts being to 15 touches. The number of fencers was also reduced.

Schedule

All times are Eastern Daylight Time (UTC-4)

Results

Section 1

Section 2

Section 3

Section 4

Finals

Results summary

References

Fencing at the 1996 Summer Olympics
Men's events at the 1996 Summer Olympics